The Middlesex Cricket Board was formed in 1996. It is the governing body for all recreational cricket in the historic county of Middlesex.

The Board of the MCB consists of four representatives nominated by the Middlesex County Cricket Club, three nominated by other specific affiliated associations, and six elected by the affiliated clubs.

MCB operates through six standing sub-committees, responsible for Cricket, Facilities, Publicity and Sponsorship, Women's Cricket, Finance, and Youth and Coaching, through it is responsible for co-ordinating all development work in Middlesex.

Board of directors
• Chairman Bob Baxter
• Chief Executive Richard Goatley
• Alastair Fraser
• Chris Goldie
• Andy Scott
• Ian Sutherland
• Malcolm Tenneson

Staff
• Head of Recreational Cricket 
• Cricket Development Manager Katie Berry
• Cricket Development Officer Rory Coutts
• Cricket Development Officer Mash Mehter
• Cricket Development Officer Ian Moore
• Cricket Development Officer 
• Cricket Volunteer Co-ordinator Martyn Fryer
• Administrator James Keightley

External links
 MCB Board

County Cricket Boards
Cricket in London
Sports organizations established in 1996